2591 Dworetsky, provisional designation , is a stony asteroid from the outer region of the asteroid belt, approximately 13 kilometers in diameter.

The asteroid was discovered on 2 August 1949, by German astronomer Karl Reinmuth at the Heidelberg Observatory in southern Germany. It was later named after British/American astronomer Michael Dworetsky.

Orbit and classification  

Dworetsky orbits the Sun in the outer main-belt at a distance of 2.8–3.1 AU once every 5.03 years (1,839 days). Its orbit has an eccentricity of 0.04 and an inclination of 2° with respect to the ecliptic.

Physical characteristics 

The asteroid has been characterized as a common S-type asteroid by PanSTARRS photometric survey.

Dworetsky has a rotation period of 12.8 hours and an albedo of 0.279 and 0.291, based on observations made by NASA's Wide-field Infrared Survey Explorer and its subsequent NEOWISE mission. The Collaborative Asteroid Lightcurve Link assumes a standard albedo for stony asteroids of 0.20, and calculates a diameter of 15.6 kilometers, based on an absolute magnitude of 11.5.

Naming 

This minor planet was named in honor of British/American astronomer Michael Dworetsky, senior lecturer at University College London (UCL). He is an active member of the International Astronomical Union, affiliated to several divisions, including "Education, Outreach and Heritage". His research involve the stellar abundances of the mercury group of elements and has also taken a large part in the development of the undergraduate astronomy degree program. The asteroid's name was proposed by Conrad Bardwell (also see 1615 Bardwell), who made the identifications involving this minor planet. The official naming citation was published by the Minor Planet Center on 27 June 1991.

References

External links 
 Dr Michael M. Dworetsky – UCL Astrophysics Group
 Asteroid Lightcurve Database (LCDB), query form (info )
 Dictionary of Minor Planet Names, Google books
 Asteroids and comets rotation curves, CdR – Observatoire de Genève, Raoul Behrend
 Discovery Circumstances: Numbered Minor Planets (1)-(5000)  – Minor Planet Center
 
 

002591
Discoveries by Karl Wilhelm Reinmuth
Named minor planets
19490802